The 2017 ABA League Playoffs is the play-off tournament that decides the winner of the 2016–17 ABA League season. The playoffs started on March 18, 2017, and ended on April 13, 2017. The winner of the play-offs qualifies for the 2017–18 EuroLeague.

Bracket

Semifinals

Game 1

Game 2

Game 3

Finals

Game 1

Game 2

Game 3

External links 
 Official website
 ABA League at Eurobasket.com

Playoffs
2016–17 in Serbian basketball
2016–17 in Croatian basketball
2016–17 in Montenegrin basketball